Józef Dominik (10 March 1894, Dobczyce - 10 September 1920, Krasne) was a Polish chess master.

Born in Dobczyce (western Galicia), he was educated in Crakow (Kraków, then Austria-Hungary). In his short chess career, he took 3rd at Crakow 1913 (Adolf Hauke won), took 2nd, behind Alexander Flamberg at Cracow 1914, took 2nd at Mannheim 1914 (Hauptturnier B, Rudniev won).

Dominik won at Vienna 1915 (Quadrangular), won at Cracow 1918, and took 5th at Warsaw 1919 (Zdzisław Belsitzmann won).

He died after a battle of Krasne (eastern Galicia) during the Polish-Soviet War in 1920.

References

1894 births
1920 deaths
Polish chess players
People from Myślenice County
Sportspeople from Lesser Poland Voivodeship
20th-century chess players